Sir Thomas Richard Arnold (born 25 January 1947) is a former politician and was the Conservative Party Member of Parliament (MP) for Hazel Grove from 1974 to 1997.

Biography 
Thomas Richard Arnold was born in London on 25 January 1947 to his parents Thomas Charles Arnold, a theatrical producer and Helen Arnold. Young Tom Arnold attended the Bedales School, the Institut Le Rosey, and Pembroke College, Oxford.

Political career 
After unsuccessfully contesting the safe Labour seat of Manchester Cheetham in 1970, Arnold was elected to the British House of Commons for Hazel Grove in October 1974, defeating the Liberal incumbent Michael Winstanley; he had fought the same seat unsuccessfully in the previous General Election that same year. He served as the Conservative Member of Parliament for Hazel Grove until his retirement in 1997. From 1979 to 1982, Arnold was the Parliamentary Private Secretary in the Northern Ireland Office and later in the Foreign and Commonwealth Office. In 1983, Arnold was appointed Vice-Chairman of the Conservative Party under Chairmen Cecil Parkinson and John Gummer.

When Arnold began office, in 1974, he was one of the youngest members of Parliament, along with Anthony Nelson and Sir Malcolm Rifkind, later joined in 1977 by both Andrew MacKay and Tim Smith. Together, during the 1970s, the five were referred to as "The Tories' Young Men", with Arnold being the only backbencher in the group. Arnold was an ardent supporter of the European Economic Community during his time in Parliament.

References

External links 

1947 births
Conservative Party (UK) MPs for English constituencies
Living people
UK MPs 1974–1979
UK MPs 1979–1983
UK MPs 1983–1987
UK MPs 1987–1992
UK MPs 1992–1997
People educated at Bedales School
Alumni of Institut Le Rosey
Knights Bachelor
People from Petersfield
Politicians awarded knighthoods
Members of the Parliament of the United Kingdom for Hazel Grove